Mae Clarke (born Violet Mary Klotz; August 16, 1910 – April 29, 1992) was an American actress. She is widely remembered for playing Henry Frankenstein's bride Elizabeth, who is chased by Boris Karloff in Frankenstein, and for being on the receiving end of  James Cagney's halved grapefruit in The Public Enemy. Both films were released in 1931.

Early life
Mae Clarke was born in Philadelphia, Pennsylvania. Her father was a theater organist. She studied dancing as a child and began on stage in vaudeville and also worked in night clubs.

Career
Clarke started her professional career as a dancer in New York City, sharing a room with Barbara Stanwyck. She subsequently starred in many films for Universal Studios, including the original screen version of The Front Page (1931) and the first sound version of Frankenstein (1931), with Boris Karloff. Clarke played the role of Henry Frankenstein's fiancée, Elizabeth, who is attacked by the Monster (Karloff) on her wedding day.
The Public Enemy, released that same year, contained one of cinema's most famous (and frequently parodied) scenes, in which James Cagney pushes a half grapefruit into Clarke's face, then goes out to pick up Jean Harlow. The film was so popular that it ran 24 hours a day at a theater in Times Square upon its initial release; scarcely 4 months after the premiere, The Hollywood Reporter informed readers that Clarke's ex-husband Lew Brice claimed to have seen the film more than 20 times (and at least twice a week), and that Brice "says he goes to see the scene wherein Mae Clarke gets hit in the eye with a grapefruit—and that it's a plazure!"

Clarke appeared as Myra Deauville in the 1931 pre-Code version of Waterloo Bridge. In the film she portrays a young American woman who is forced by circumstance into a life of prostitution in World War I London; both the film and Clarke's performance were well received by the critics.

Clarke also appeared in the modest pre-Code Universal film Night World (1932), with Lew Ayres, Boris Karloff, Hedda Hopper, and George Raft. In 1933 she was the female lead in Fast Workers, John Gilbert's last film as a contracted MGM star, and Lady Killer with James Cagney and Margaret Lindsay. That same year, she and actor Phillips Holmes were in a single-car accident that left Clarke with a broken jaw and facial scarring. Those injuries, however, did not end her film career, for she remained a leading lady for most of the 1930s. She was, though, increasingly cast in productions with lower budgets that lacked the status of her earlier films. Then, by 1940, Clarke slipped into supporting roles, although she did have a few last leading roles later in the decade, notably as the heroine in the Republic serial King of the Rocket Men (1949).
In the 1950s and 1960s, Clarke played uncredited bit parts in several notable films, including Singin' in the Rain, The Great Caruso, and Thoroughly Modern Millie. Her last screen appearance was in the 1970 film Watermelon Man.

On television, Clarke appeared in many episodic series, including General Hospital, Perry Mason and Batman. Clarke retired in 1970 and taught drama.

Personal life and death
Clarke was married and divorced three times: to Fanny Brice's brother Lew Brice, Stevens Bancroft, and Herbert Langdon. All of the unions were childless.

In later years Clarke resided at the Motion Picture & Television Country House and Hospital in Woodland Hills, California. Clarke died from cancer on April 29, 1992, at age 81. She is buried in Valhalla Memorial Park Cemetery.

Selected filmography

Features

Big Time (1929) - Lily Clark
Nix on Dames (1929) - Jackie Lee
The Fall Guy (1930) - Bertha Quinlan
The Dancers (1930) - Maxine
Men on Call (1930) - Helen Gordon / Helen Harding
The Front Page (1931) - Molly Molloy
The Public Enemy (1931) - Kitty (uncredited)
The Good Bad Girl (1931) - Marcia Cameron
Waterloo Bridge (1931) - Myra
Reckless Living (1931) - Bee
Frankenstein (1931) - Elizabeth 
Three Wise Girls (1932) - Gladys Kane
The Final Edition (1932) - Ann Woodman
Impatient Maiden (1932) - Ruth Robbins
Night World (1932) - Ruth Taylor
Flaming Gold (1932) - Claire Gordon
Breach of Promise (1932) - Hattie Pugmire
The Penguin Pool Murder (1932) - Gwen Parker
As the Devil Commands  (1932) - Jane Chase
Parole Girl (1933) - Sylvia Day
Fast Workers (1933) - Mary
Turn Back the Clock (1933) - Mary Gimlet / Mary Wright
Penthouse (1933) - Mimi Montagne
Lady Killer (1933) - Myra Gale
Nana (1934) - Satin
This Side of Heaven (1934) - Jane Turner
Let's Talk It Over (1934) - Pat Rockland
The Man with Two Faces (1934) - Daphne Flowers
Silk Hat Kid (1935) - Laura Grant
The Daring Young Man (1935) - Martha Allen
Hitch Hike Lady (1935) - Judith Martin
The House of a Thousand Candles (1936) - Carol Vincent
Hearts in Bondage (1936) - Constance Jordan
Wild Brian Kent (1936) - Betty Prentice
Hats Off (1936) - Jo Allen
Great Guy (1936) - Janet Henry
Trouble in Morocco (1937) - Linda Lawrence
Outlaws of the Orient (1937) - Joan Manning
Women in War (1940) - Gail Halliday
Sailors on Leave (1941) - Gwen
Flying Tigers (1942) - Verna Bales
Lady from Chungking (1942) - Lavara
And Now Tomorrow (1944) - Receptionist (uncredited)
Here Come the Waves (1944) - Ens. Kirk (uncredited)
Kitty (1945) - Molly
Reaching from Heaven (1948) - Dorothy Gram
Daredevils of the Clouds (1948) - Kay Cameron
Gun Runner (1949) - Kate Diamond
Streets of San Francisco (1949) - Hazel Logan
King of the Rocket Men (1949, Serial) - Glenda Thomas
The Yellow Cab Man (1950) - Casualty Company Secretary (uncredited)
The Reformer and the Redhead (1950) - Counter Lady with Change for a Quarter (uncredited)
Annie Get Your Gun (1950) - Mrs. Adams, Party Guest (uncredited)
The Skipper Surprised His Wife (1950) - Clubwoman (uncredited)
Duchess of Idaho (1950) - Betty - Flower Shop Saleslady (uncredited)
Mrs. O'Malley and Mr. Malone (1950) - Train Passenger (uncredited)
Three Guys Named Mike (1951) - Convair Passenger (uncredited)
Inside Straight (1951) - Nurse (uncredited)
Mr. Imperium (1951) - Minor Role (uncredited)
Royal Wedding (1951) - Telephone Operator #1 (uncredited)
The Great Caruso (1951) - Woman (uncredited)
The People Against O'Hara (1951) - Receptionist (uncredited)
The Unknown Man (1951) - Stella's Friend (uncredited)
Callaway Went Thataway (1951) - Mother on Train (uncredited)
Love Is Better Than Ever (1952) - Mrs. Island (uncredited)
Singin' in the Rain (1952) - Hairdresser (uncredited)
Carbine Williams (1952) - Courtroom Spectator (uncredited)
Skirts Ahoy! (1952) - Miss LaValle (uncredited)
Pat and Mike (1952) - Golfer (uncredited)
Holiday for Sinners (1952) - Minor Role (uncredited)
Fearless Fagan (1952) - Hospital Telephone Operator (uncredited)
The Miracle of Our Lady of Fatima (1952) - Townswoman (uncredited)
Horizons West (1952) - Mrs. Jane Tarleton
Thunderbirds (1952) - Mrs. Jones
Because of You (1952) - Miss Peach / Nurse Peachie
Confidentially Connie (1953) - Happy Shopper (uncredited)
Magnificent Obsession (1954) - Mrs. Miller
Women's Prison (1955) - Matron Saunders
Not as a Stranger (1955) - Nurse Odell
Wichita (1955) - Mrs McCoy.
I Died a Thousand Times (1955) - Mabel Baughman (uncredited)
Come Next Spring (1956) - Myrtle
Mohawk (1956) - Minikah
The Catered Affair (1956) - Saleswoman (uncredited)
The Desperados Are in Town (1956) - Jane Kesh
 Ride the High Iron (1956) - Mrs. Vanders
Decision at Sundown (1957)
Voice in the Mirror (1958) - Mrs. Robbins
Ask Any Girl (1959) - Woman on Train (uncredited)
A Big Hand for the Little Lady (1966) - Mrs. Craig
Thoroughly Modern Millie (1967) - Secretary (uncredited)
Watermelon Man (1970) - Old Woman (uncredited)

Short subjects
Screen Snapshots (1932, Documentary short) - Herself
Screen Snapshots Series 16, No. 7 (1937, Documentary short) - Herself

Notes

References
Bibliography
Cagney, James. Cagney by Cagney. New York: Doubleday, 1976. .
Clarke, Mae. Featured Player: An Oral Autobiography of Mae Clarke; Edited With An Introduction by James Curtis. Santa Barbara: Santa Teresa Press, 1996. .
Goldman, Herbert G. Fanny Brice. New York: Oxford University Press, 1992. .
Halliwell, Leslie. Halliwell's Filmgoers Companion (Halliwell's Who's Who in the Movies). New York: Collins Reference, 1997. .
Madsen, Axel. Stanwyck: A Biography. New York: HarperCollins, 1994. .

Footnotes

Further reading
Clarke, Mae (April 23, 1948). "The Unlit Candle". The Tidings. p. 11
Associated Press (February 21, 1949) "Movie Veteran Picks 'Unconceited' Stars". Fort Worth Star-Telegram. p. 8
Parsons, Louella (November 16, 1949). "Inside Hollywood". The Hanford Sentinel. p. 2
Thomas, Bob (October 27, 1953). "Screen Cinderella of Thirties in Broke Now; Mae Clarke—Still a Beauty at 42—Longs for a New Career on the Screen". Pittsburgh Post-Gazette. p. 29
Avrech, Robert J. (August 16, 2017). "Hidden Hollywood: Mae Clarke, Girl, Gangster, Grapefruit". Seraphic Secret.

External links

Mae Clarke at Virtual History

American film actresses
American television actresses
Burials at Valhalla Memorial Park Cemetery
Deaths from cancer in California
Actresses from Philadelphia
1910 births
1992 deaths
20th-century American actresses